Soji of Silla was Ruler of Silla (died 500, r. 479–500). He was preceded by Jabi Maripgan (458–479) and succeeded by King Jijeung (500–514).

Family
Grandfather: King Nulji of Silla
Grandmother: Queen Aro, of the Kim clan (아로부인 김씨), daughter of King Silseong
Father: Jabi of Silla
Mother: Queen Kim, of the Kim clan (왕후김씨), daughter of Kim Misaheun (김미사흔)
Wife:
Queen Seonhye (선혜부인), of the Kim clan (왕후김씨), daughter of Galmunwang Seupbo and Queen Josaeng
Daughter: Princess Bodo  (보도부인), wife of Boepheung of Silla
Queen Yeonje,  of the Park clan (연제부인 박씨)
 Son: Prince Sanjong (산종)
Queen Byeoghwa (벽화부인), of the Park clan (박씨), daughter of Park Palo (박파로)
Son: Kim Isabu (이사부)–was a military general and politician of Silla

See also
Three Kingdoms of Korea
List of Korean monarchs
List of Silla people

References

Silla rulers
500 deaths
5th-century monarchs in Asia
Year of birth unknown
5th-century Korean people